Diplospora is a genus of flowering plants in the family Rubiaceae. The genus is found in tropical and subtropical Asia.

Species

Diplospora bilocularis (Kurz) M.Gangop. & Chakrab. - Burma
Diplospora cuspidata Valeton - Sarawak
Diplospora dubia (Lindl.) Masam. - China, Vietnam, Taiwan, Ryukyu Islands
Diplospora erythrospora (Thwaites) Bedd. - Sri Lanka
Diplospora fasciculiflora (Elmer) Elmer - Philippines
Diplospora fruticosa Hemsl. - China, Vietnam
Diplospora griffithii Hook.f. - Burma
Diplospora kunstleri King & Gamble - Malaysia
Diplospora lasiantha Ridl. - Malaysia
Diplospora majumdarii M.Gangop. & Chakrab. - Perak
Diplospora minahassae Koord. - northern Sulawesi
Diplospora mollissima Hutch. - Yunnan
Diplospora negrosensis  (Elmer) Arriola & Alejandro
Diplospora puberula (Merr.) S.J.Ali & Robbr. - Philippines
Diplospora pubescens Hook.f. - Burma
Diplospora schmidthii (K.Schum. Craib. - Thailand, Peninsular Malaysia
Diplospora sessilis Elmer - Philippines
Diplospora siamica Craib - Burma, Thailand
Diplospora sorsogonensis (Elmer) A.P.Davis - Luzon
Diplospora stylosa Ridl. - Thailand, Peninsular Malaysia
Diplospora tinagoensis (Elmer) S.J.Ali & Robbr. - Borneo, Philippines
Diplospora velutina King & Gamble - Perak
Diplospora wrayi King & Gamble - Peninsular Malaysia

References

 
Rubiaceae genera